Martial Simon (11 December 1898 – 1 June 1977) was a French racewalker. He competed in the men's 10 kilometres walk at the 1920 Summer Olympics.

References

1898 births
1977 deaths
Athletes (track and field) at the 1920 Summer Olympics
French male racewalkers
Olympic athletes of France
Place of birth missing